Subhash Chandra Lakhotia (born 4 October 1945) is an Indian cytogeneticist, academic, Distinguished Professor of zoology, and INSA senior scientist at Banaras Hindu University. He is known for his pioneering researches on Drosophila with regard to its chromosome organization and replication. A Raja Ramanna fellow of the Department of Science and Technology and the Department of Atomic Energy, he is an elected fellow of all three major Indian science academies: Indian National Science Academy, Indian Academy of Sciences and National Academy of Sciences, India. The Council of Scientific and Industrial Research, the apex agency of the Government of India for scientific research, awarded him the Shanti Swarup Bhatnagar Prize for Science and Technology, one of the highest Indian science awards, in 1989, for his contributions to biological sciences.

Biography 

Subhash Chandra Lakhotia, born on 4 October 1945 in Churu, a city near Thar desert in the Indian state of Rajasthan, to a Dwarka Prasad-Suryakala couple, did his early schooling in Churu and then in Kolkata.

He graduated from Vidyasagar College, Calcutta University in Zoology Honours in 1964 before obtaining his master's degree in Zoology and Comparative Anatomy in 1966, both from Calcutta University. Continuing his doctoral studies at the same university at the Zoology Department, he secured his PhD in 1970, did his post-doctoral studies at Delhi University during 1970–71 and started his career as a lecturer at Burdwan University in 1971. Moving to Gujarat University in June 1972, he stayed there until September 1976 before joining Banaras Hindu University as a reader. He became a full professor in 1984 and continued there until superannuation in 2010. In between, he carried out some advanced studies at the Institute of Animal Genetics of the University of Edinburgh during 1972-73, at the University of California, Irvine during 1984-85 and at Massachusetts Institute of Technology, Cambridge in 1985. After his formal superannuation, he continued his academic activities at the Banaras Hindu University as INSA senior scientist from January 2017 to January 2019. He is now working as life-long Distinguished Professor and SERB Distinguished Fellow.

Legacy 

Lakhotia's researches are focused on cytogenetics, gene expression, cell and developmental biology. He carried out pioneering research on Drosophila (fruit flies) with regard to its chromosome organization and replication, and on the organization and functions of the long-non-coding RNA 93D or the hsromega gene locus of Drosophila melanogaster. During his doctoral studies on dosage compensation in Drosophila he further confirmed the hyperactive male-X model and elucidated its cellular autonomy. His discovery of active transcription in heterochromatin in Drosophila in early 1970s was one of the first documentations of transcriptional activity of heterochromatin. His later studies revealed the existence of two distinct replicon types in different cell types of Drosophila.

He has been a pioneer researcher studying the long non-coding RNAs since 1980s and has contributed significantly to a wider appreciation of their function through sustained studies on the hsromega gene. His laboratory discovered the omega speckles in Drosophila nuclei and established essential functions of the lncRNAs produced by the hsromega gene in organization of the intra-nuclear omega speckles. His studies also helped identify how this lncRNA gene modulates apoptosis and neurodegeneration in Drosophila models of human diseases. More recently, he established Drosophila as a good model to understand the mechanisms of actions of some of the ayurvedic formulations.

His studies indicate that the Ayurvedic Amalaki Rasayana and Rasa-Sindoor can substantially suppress neurodegeneration associated with polyQ and Alzheimer's disorders.

He has published more than 165 original research papers, review articles, and chapters in books, available at PubMed, an online repository of medical articles, and at ResearchGate. He has also written many articles relating policies about higher education, research publications, their assessment and ethics.

He has mentored more than 30 scholars in their doctoral studies.

Lakhotia contributed to the establishment of the Department of Molecular and Human Genetics at Banaras Hindu University and to the installation of the Confocal microscope facility at his department.

Besides his research contributions, Lakhotia is also well known for his many writings on education. He served as a member of one of the sub-committees of the National Knowledge Commission, sat in the Committee on Science Education of the International Council for Science (ICSU) in 2010 and was a member of its review panel. He was associated with the International Union of Biological Sciences, was a member of its executive committee from 2000 to 2003 and served as its vice president from 2003 to 2006. He is a former member of INSA council, a former vice president, and vice president of its Inter-Academy Exchange Committee. He was the editor-in-chief of its journal (Proceedings of the Indian National Science Academy) from January 2014 to December 2018. He has been associated with the Council of Scientific and Industrial Research, University Grants Commission of India, Department of Atomic Energy, Department of Science and Technology and Department of Biotechnology as a member of their various committees, and has served or is continuing as a member of the editorial boards of journals such as Current Science, Journal of Biosciences, RNA Biology, Cell Stress and Chaperones and Annals of Neurosciences. He is a life member of the Indian Society of Cell Biology, Indian Society of Developmental Biology, Cell Stress Society International, Genetics Society of America and RNA Society. Recently, he was elected a Senior Fellow of the Cell Stress Society International.

Awards and honors 
Lakhotia received the Young Scientists Medal of the Indian National Science Academy in 1975 and the Career Award in Sciences of the University Grants Commission of India (UGC) in 1979. The Council of Scientific and Industrial Research awarded him the Shanti Swarup Bhatnagar Prize, one of the highest Indian science awards, in 1989, the same year that he was selected as the National Lecturer by the UGC. The Commission honored him again in 1998 with the J.C. Bose Award, and he received INSA Sunder Lal Hora Medal in 2002. The Banaras Hindu University gave him the 2007 Professor CNR Rao Education Foundation Award.

Lakhotia has held the Ramanna fellowship of the Department of Science and Technology from 2009 and the Raja Ramanna Fellowship of the Department of Atomic Energy from 2011. He held the Jawaharlal Nehru Birth Centenary Fellowship and Senior Scientist position of the Indian National Science Academy in 2009. He was elected as a fellow by the Indian National Science Academy in 1993, by the Indian Academy of Sciences in 1994 and by the National Academy of Sciences, India in 2002. He was elected the Senior Fellow of the Cell Stress Society International in 2017.

He has delivered several award lectures, including the 18th G.J.S. Rao Memorial Award Lecture of the Indian Institute of Science in 2011, the Arya Bhatta Medal lecture of the Indian National Science Academy (2018)  and the IASTAM Zandu International (Indian Citizen) Award for Excellence in Field of Ayurveda and/or Natural Products Award 2019. In 2019, he was awarded the SERB Distinguished Fellowship (2019).

See also 
 Gene expression

References

External links 
 
 
 
 

Recipients of the Shanti Swarup Bhatnagar Award in Biological Science
1945 births
People from Churu district
20th-century Indian zoologists
Cytogenetics
Indian cell biologists
Indian scientific authors
University of Calcutta alumni
Delhi University alumni
University of California, Irvine alumni
Massachusetts Institute of Technology alumni
Academic staff of the University of Burdwan
Academic staff of Gujarat University
Academic staff of Banaras Hindu University
Fellows of the Indian Academy of Sciences
Fellows of the Indian National Science Academy
Fellows of The National Academy of Sciences, India
Living people
Scientists from Rajasthan